The Town Police Clauses Act 1847 is an Act of the Parliament of the United Kingdom (10 & 11 Vict c. 89). The statute remains in force in both the United Kingdom (except Scotland) and the Republic of Ireland, and is frequently used by local councils to close roads to allow public events such as processions or street parties to take place. The Act is also used to regulate the local hackney carriage, taxi and private-hire trade in many areas. It deals with a range of street obstructions and nuisances, for example, it makes it illegal to perform certain actions in a public street or other thoroughfare, such as hanging washing, beating carpets, and flying kites, although many of those clauses were repealed in 2015. Historically, it was highly significant legislating against indecent exposure, indecent acts, obscene publications, and prostitution.

Background 
In 1847, the House of Commons Select Committee on Private Bills presented a report. In 1842 to 1843, the average number of private bills passed was 161, rising to an average of 347 from 1845 to 1846. By 21 July 1847, the House of Commons, 490 petitions for private bills were received that year. Already in place, resulting from early reports by the select committee, new mechanisms were in place to deal more efficiently with private bills.

Noting was that much of the business the House of Commons was dealing with were numerous private bills, which due to the clauses they contained, were essentially public bills. Drawing up private bills to deal with public functions had consequences. The select committee wrote:

To provide uniformity in legislation in different geographical areas, to reduce the number of private bills about public functions, and to reduce expense, the select committee proposed eight public acts, each dealing with a different topic:

 Markets and fairs
 Gasworks
 Public commissioners
 Waterworks
 Harbour, docks and piers
 Town improvements
 Cemeteries
 Police

The police legislation was enacted as the Town Police Clauses Act 1847.

Original purposes of the act 
The original Act covered six areas,
 Police regulations and administration
 Obstructions and nuisances, including several significant offences about indecent exposure, indecent acts, and obscene publications
 Fires and administration of fire fighting
 Regulating places of public resort, for example, coffee shops and refreshment house used as meeting places for thieves and prostitutes, places for bear baiting and cock fighting
 Public bathing
 Hackney carriages

Provisions still in force 
Many clauses of the act are still in force; these are provisions dealing with

 Preventing obstructions during street processions
 Prohibiting stage carriages from diverting from a prescribed route
 Powers enabling the building of pounds for stray animals
 Impounding stray cattle, selling them, and unlawfully releasing them from a pound
 A significant number of nuisances and obstructions to the highway
 Violent and indecent behaviour in a police station
 Accidentally allowing chimney fires
 Keeping places for animal fighting, baiting, or worrying them, for example bear baiting and cock fighting
 Hackney carriages

The act is still relevant to policing the highway. Many offences in the act relating to nuisance and obstruction in the street, and the act is also a means of regulating road closures for special events.

The law controls the use of fireworks, and the wanton discharge of firearms in the street. A significant role is the licensing of hackney carriages.  It also prohibits the wanton furious driving of a horse and carriage in the street.   A role of the Act is to regulate peoples' behaviour. It remains an offence to be disorderly or insulting in a police station.

Until 2003, the Act was one piece of legislation against prostitution in a range of premises, including hotels. Although superseded by other laws a conviction for indecency, deriving from the Act, is on a list of offences which can be used to identify those who present a risk, or potential risk, to children.

See also 
 Local board of health

References

External links 
 Town Police Clauses Act 1847 (as enacted)
 Town Police Clauses Act 1847 (as currently in force, published on legislation.gov.uk)
 Irish Statute Book

United Kingdom Acts of Parliament 1847
Police legislation in the United Kingdom
Sex laws
Sex crimes in England
Sexual misconduct
Obscenity law
Book censorship in the United Kingdom
Prostitution law in the United Kingdom
Baiting (blood sport)
Cockfighting
Transport law in the United Kingdom
Anti-social behaviour